The Hämeenmaa-class minelayers (-luokan miinalaiva) is a two vessel strong class of coastal minelayers, used by the Finnish Navy.

The ships have a steel hull and aluminum alloy superstructure. The class has an ice operating classification of ICE-1A and can operate year-round in ice up to 40 cm thick. The design included some first attempts on stealth technology in the Finnish Navy.

During a crisis the main task for the Hämeenmaa-class ships is minelaying, but the vessels can also act as escort, transport and depot ships.

History 

The contract for the Hämeenmaa class was originally awarded to Wärtsilä Marine, but following its bankruptcy the contract was transferred to Hollming. Turmoil in the Finnish shipbuilding industry didn't stop there. In early 1992 Hollming and Rauma Yards merged their shipbuilding industry to form a new company called Finnyards.

Modernization

Both ships were modernized 200608. The purpose of the modernization was to firstly upgrade the ships' equipment to fit modern standards, and secondly, to enable the ships to participate in international operations, mainly European Security and Defence Policy operations. They are fitted with weapons systems transferred from the discontinued  including the Umkhonto missile system. Also a new fire control system Saab 9LV325E FCS, modern monitoring equipment including TRS-3D/16 ES surveillance radar and Kongsberg ST2400 Variable Depth Sonar and SS2030 Hull mounted sonar, were installed.

In October 2013, Hämeenmaa changed its homeport from Pansio to Upinniemi to replace the decommissioned .

Role after modernization

Modernization of the two Hämeenmaa-class ships serves of course the interests of Finnish Navy, but also the ones of EU's Helsinki Headline Goal: these two ships will add to the EU‘s capabilities, having relatively wide selection of roles that they can assume, from light espionage- and minelaying to escort- and anti-submarine warfare ship, these two vehicles are practically perfect for monitoring Russia's Baltic fleet.

Hämeenmaa was delivered from the dock back to the Navy on 13 April 2007 and Uusimaa, which had been under modernization since November 2006 at the Aker Yards dock in Rauma, was delivered on 26 October 2007. Hämeenmaa and Uusimaa conducted sea trials on their new systems until the end of 2008, when operational readiness was achieved. In October 2013 Hämeenmaa took over the role of flagship of the Finnish Navy with the retirement of Pohjanmaa in 2015.

Vessels 

FNS Hämeenmaa
Pennant number: 02.
Builder: Finnyards.
Ordered: 29 December 1989.
Laid down: 2 April 1991.
Launched: 11 November 1991.
Commissioned: 15 April 1992.
Home base: Upinniemi.
Current status: In active service.
FNS Uusimaa
Pennant number: 05.
Builder: Finnyards.
Ordered: 13 February 1991.
Laid down: 12 November 1991.
Launched: June 1992.
Commissioned: 2 December 1992.
Home base: Pansio.
Current status: In active service.

References 

 
 
 

Mine warfare vessel classes
Minelayers of the Finnish Navy
Ships built in Finland